Mbweni is a town on the Tanzanian island of Unguja, the main island of Zanzibar. It is located on the central west coast, seven kilometres south of the Zanzibari capital of Stone Town.

The town is a popular day trip for tourists and locals. Mbweni's attractions include botanical gardens and the ruins of a nineteenth-century Christian mission.

See also
List of Swahili settlements of the East African coast

References
 Finke, J. (2006) The Rough Guide to Zanzibar (2nd edition). New York: Rough Guides.

Swahili people
Swahili city-states
Swahili culture
Villages in Zanzibar